The Bean Hill Historic District is a historic district in Norwich, Connecticut that was listed on the National Register of Historic Places in 1982. It consists of a well-preserved collection of buildings focused on the Bean Hill Green, which capture the  19th-century period when Bean Hill was a local center for manufacturing and commercial activity. The district is located in the vicinity of West Town Street (old Route 2) between I-395 and Connecticut Avenue, and also extends northeast along Huntington Avenue to include properties further beyond Bean Hill Plain (the village green).

The Been Hill Green is a square parcel of open space bounded by Vegason Avenue, Huntington Avenue, and West Town Street.  It was laid out in 1729, forming the centerpiece of a residential nucleus.  The buildings facing the green include four houses from the 18th century, as well as the former 1833 Bean Hill Methodist Church, the first Methodist church in Norwich; the Greek Revival architecture has lost its steeple, and is now in commercial use.  West Town Street is the major east-west thoroughfare in western Norwich, and was lined in the 19th century by a variety of houses and business, some of which still survive.  One example of late 19th-century commercial architecture is at 204 West Town Street, which was built about 1870, on the site of what was believed to be the first house to stand in the area.

See also
Neighborhoods of Norwich, Connecticut
National Register of Historic Places listings in New London County, Connecticut

References

Historic districts in New London County, Connecticut
Norwich, Connecticut
Historic districts on the National Register of Historic Places in Connecticut
National Register of Historic Places in New London County, Connecticut
Saltbox architecture in Connecticut